The Imaginative Conservative (TIC) is an online traditionalist conservative journal published in the United States, founded in 2010.

History
The co-founders of TIC were Bradley J. Birzer, the holder of the Russell Amos Kirk chair in American Studies at Hillsdale College, and W. Winston Elliott III, President of the Free Enterprise Institute and a Visiting Professor in Liberal Arts at Houston Baptist University. 

Conceived early in 2010 and launched in June of that year, TIC was initially dedicated to promoting conservatism in general and the ideas of Russell Kirk in particular. In its first year it published an article by Steve Masty, a veteran of the Afghanistan conflict, which was deeply critical of American policy and intentions there. 

In 2015, TIC republished Russell Kirk's book Prospects for Conservatives, with an introduction by Bradley J. Birzer which called the work a "Christian humanistic manifesto". 
Also in 2015, the journal published a list of suggested gifts for conservatives, which included badger-hair shaving brushes and Evelyn Waugh's novel Brideshead Revisited.

As of 2021, the journal  said of itself that its purpose was to address culture, liberal learning, politics, political economy, literature, the arts, and the American Republic, in the tradition of Kirk, Irving Babbitt, M. E. Bradford, Edmund Burke, Willa Cather, Christopher Dawson, T. S. Eliot, Paul Elmer More, Robert Nisbet, Wilhelm Roepke, Eric Voegelin, Richard M. Weaver, and other leaders of Imaginative Conservatism.

Contributors 
Notable contributors to The Imaginative Conservative have included 
Michael D. Aeschliman
Michael Bauman
Stratford Caldecott
Bruce Frohnen
 Lowell S. Gustafson
Ross M. Lence
Benjamin Myers
Derek Turner
Gleaves Whitney

See also 
 Classical liberalism
 Conservatism in the United States
 List of United States magazines
 Traditionalist conservatism

References

External links 
 

Conservative magazines published in the United States
Old Right (United States)